Luis Ortiz may refer to:

Sports
 Luis Ortiz (Cuban boxer) (born 1979), Cuban boxer in 2005 Boxing World Cup
 Luis Ortiz (Puerto Rican boxer) (born 1965), Puerto Rican boxer
 Luis Ortiz (third baseman) (born 1970), Dominican baseball player
 Luis Ortiz (pitcher, born 1995), American baseball player
 Luis Ortiz (pitcher, born 1999), Dominican baseball player
 Luis Ortiz (sport shooter) (born 1951), Colombian sports shooter

Other
 Luis "Perico" Ortiz (born 1949), Puerto Rican trumpet player and composer
 Luis D. Ortiz (born 1986), Puerto Rican realtor
 Luis Ortiz González (1932–2006), Spanish politician
 Luis Ortiz Lugo, Puerto Rican politician
 Luis Ortiz Monasterio (1906–1990), Mexican sculptor
 Luis Ortiz Rosales (died 1937), Spanish artist